The University of Mary Washington Rowing team is the club rowing (sport) team of the University of Mary Washington, located in Fredericksburg, Virginia. The program was a founding member of the Mid-Atlantic Rowing Conference in 2008, and has remained therein since.

History

Coaches
Brad Holdren
Phil Schmehl

Facility
The team practiced at Lake of the Woods until the fall of 2007 when it relocated to the Rappahannock River. After flooding of the river washed out a dock, the program began rowing at Aquia Creek in Stafford, Virginia.
At Hope Springs Marina, the crew team practices in the morning, six days a week in the fall and spring, weather permitting.

Status of the team
In August 2007 the University's administration declared that the program would be recommended for long-term suspension. The team was successfully reinstated through the efforts of alumni, current rowers, and the University as a whole. However, in the spring of 2014, it was announced that the team would be losing its varsity status and would be transitioning to a club program pending student interest. The team is currently underneath "club" status, and reports to the University of Mary Washington's department of  campus recreation.

Events
On November 12, 2016, the team dedicated a WinTech 8+ men's shell to Robert Ericson, a team member who died in April 2014.

Notable members

Kelley Tice: All-American (2004, 2005, 2006, 2007)
Kemp Savage: Head Coach Women's Rowing at Eastern Michigan University
Brandon Kramer: Associate Professor at Kwansei Gakuin University, GOAT

References

External links
http://umweagles.com/sports/rowing/index

Rowing clubs in the United States
University of Mary Washington